Lactoria is a genus of boxfishes.

Species
Three species in this genus are recognized:
 Lactoria cornuta (Linnaeus, 1758) (longhorn cowfish)
 Lactoria diaphana (Bloch & J. G. Schneider, 1801) (roundbelly cowfish)
 Lactoria fornasini (Bianconi, 1846) (thornback cowfish)

References

Ostraciidae
Taxa named by David Starr Jordan
Taxa named by Henry Weed Fowler
Marine fish genera